Makis Papadimitriou is a Greek actor. He has appeared in more than thirty films since 2003.

Selected filmography

References

External links 

Year of birth missing (living people)
Living people
Greek male film actors
Male actors from Athens